Barshi Taluka is one of the 11 tehsils of Solapur District in the Indian state of Maharashtra. This tehsil occupies the Northeast corner of the district and is bordered by Osmanabad District to the north and east, Madha Taluka to the west, Mohol Taluka to the southwest and North Solapur Taluka to the south. The tehsil headquarters is located at Barshi, which is also the largest city in the tehsil.

As of 2011, the tehsil population was 600,000

References

External links
The official website of Solapur district
Barshi Tehsil on Biond

Talukas in Solapur district